René Boyvin (1525–1598) was an influential French engraver who lived in Angers.

References
 Jacques Levron: René Boyvin, graveur angevin du 16e siècle, avec catalogue de son oeuvre et la reproduction de 114 estampes. Angers 1941

External links
 Cornell University Johnson Museum of Art: Boyvin

People from Angers
1525 births
1598 deaths
French engravers